This is a list of territories of the Portuguese Empire, that at various times were officially called "states" (estados):
State of India (Estado da Índia) (1505–1961)
State of Brazil (Estado do Brasil) (1621–1815)
State of Maranhão (Estado do Maranhão) (1621–1751)
State of Grão-Pará and Maranhão (Estado do Grão-Pará e Maranhão) (1751–1772)
State of Grão-Pará and Rio Negro (Estado do Grão-Pará e Rio Negro) (1772–1775)
State of Maranhão and Piauí (Estado do Maranhão e Piauí) (1772–1775)
State of Angola (Estado de Angola) (1972–1975)
State of Mozambique (Estado de Moçambique) (1972–1975)

References